Sir Edgar Britten KB RD RNR (1874 – October 28, 1936) was a Cunard Line captain remembered primarily for being the first captain of the ocean liner  in 1936.

Born in Bradford, England, he began his career as a cabin boy. In New York on the Queen Mary maiden voyage, Britten was interviewed by the newsreels and for posterity he was recorded on sound film giving his opinion on the details of the ship.

Death
In October 1936, Britten died in hospital in Southampton after being found unconscious in his cabin onboard the  earlier in the day, prior to the ship's departure to New York. He was later buried at sea.

References

External links
Some Queen Mary maiden voyage newsreels

1874 births
1936 deaths
Steamship captains
English sailors
Royal Navy officers